Single Visit Dentistry allows for crowns, veneers, inlays and onlays, bridges, and implant restorations to be fabricated during a single dental appointment. Traditionally these procedures take upwards of two appointments

CEREC
CEREC (Chair-side Economical Restoration of Esthetic Ceramics) is a method of CAD/CAM (Computer Aided Design/Computer Aided Manufacturing) dentistry developed by W. Mörmann and M. Brandestini at the University of Zurich in 1980. 

CEREC uses CAD/CAM technology, which incorporates a camera, computer, and milling machine into one instrument. The instrument uses a specialty camera that takes a precise 3-D picture of the tooth or space to be restored. The optical impression is transferred and displayed on a colour computer screen where the dentist or staff design the restoration. Then, the CAM takes over and automatically creates the restoration. The last step is when the newly created restoration is bonded to the surface of the old tooth. This entire process is completed in a single dental appointment.

References

Dentistry